Moni Aizik is an Israeli-born martial artist. Aizik has a jujutsu and judo background and is the founder of Commando Krav Maga.

Israel
At the age of eight, under Opa Schutte, Aizik started training in judo and jujutsu. He won  national title in judo seven times.

Aizik states that he was asked, shortly after the Yom Kippur War, to improve upon the army's existing hand-to-hand combat system due to his knowledge of martial arts, including various Israeli fighting systems, jujitsu and judo. 

After his military service he trained at a Maccabi Tel Aviv club in Israel: Krav maga(CKM), Jiujitsu, and Judo. One of Aizik's students was Yael Arad, a 1992 Olympic silver medalist in judo.

North America
Moving to North America in the 1980s, Aizik started teaching CKM at the Jewish Community Center in Toronto, Ontario, and later opened The Samurai Club martial center where he taught Commando Krav maga, Judo, MMA and Jiujitsu. Among his students were the former UFC Welterweight Champion Carlos Newton and Joel Gerson. In 2006 Aizik start spreading Commando Krav maga (CKM) all over the world.

United Kingdom
On October 28, 2008, the British Advertising Standards Authority stated that Aizik cannot use "Ex-Israeli Special Forces Commando" or "Counter Terrorism Expert" in his advertising there since those claims can not be substantiated. Aizik says such documentation is classified.

Personal life
His son, Tal Aizik, is a professional Dota 2 player who currently plays for Shopify Rebellion.

References

External links
 Moni Aizik official page on Facebook

Israeli male martial artists
Krav Maga practitioners
Israeli expatriates in Canada
Living people
Year of birth missing (living people)
Israeli jujutsuka
Israeli male judoka
Judoka trainers